Albert Pearson may refer to:

 Albert J. Pearson (1846–1905), U.S. Representative from Ohio
 Albert Pearson (footballer) (1892–1975), English footballer
 Albert H. Pearson (1920–1963), American farmer and politician
 Albie Pearson (1934–2023), American baseballer.